The 1973 Western Championships, also known as the Cincinnati Open, was a combined men's and women's tennis tournament played on outdoor clay courts at the Queen City Racquet Club in the Sharonville suburb of Cincinnati, Ohio in the United States that was part of the 1973 Commercial Union Assurance Grand Prix. The tournament was held from August 6 through August 12, 1973. Ilie Năstase  and Evonne Goolagong won the singles titles.

Finals

Men's singles
 Ilie Năstase defeated  Manuel Orantes 5–7, 6–3, 6–4

Women's singles
 Evonne Goolagong defeated  Chris Evert 6–2, 7–5

Men's doubles
 John Alexander /  Phil Dent defeated  Brian Gottfried /  Raúl Ramírez 1–6, 7–6, 7–6

Women's doubles
 Ilana Kloss /  Pat Pretorius defeated  Evonne Goolagong /  Janet Young 7–6, 3–6, 6–2

References

External links
 
 Association of Tennis Professionals (ATP) – tournament profile
 International Tennis Federation (ITF) – Cincinnati men's tournament details

Cincinnati Open
Cincinnati Masters
Cincinnati Open
Cincinnati Open
Cincinnati Open